Matryoska is the 13th and the last studio album of Belarusian rock group Lyapis Trubetskoy. It was released on March 1, 2014.

About album 
At the same time the album was released, the group started a new tour, also named "Matryoshka". The group visited all the larger cities of Russia and Ukraine and also included other countries such as Latvia, Lithuania, Estonia, Kazakhstan, Poland, Czech, Germany, and Israel.

The album consists of ten new songs and the cover on "Государство", a song by Grazhdanskaya Oborona.

Track listing

Personnel 
 Siarhei Mikhalok- vocals
 Ruslan Vladyko - guitar
 Pavel Bulatnikov - vocals, percussion
 Ivan Galushko - trombone
 Denis Sturchenko - bass guitar
 Vlad Senkevich - trumpet
 Denis Shurov - percussion
 Andrei Babrouka - sound engineer
 Dmitry Bobrovko - scene technician
 Pavel Tretyak - acoustic guitar
 Vlad Yarun
 Ted Jensen at Sterling Sound NYCЕ - mastering

References

Lyapis Trubetskoy albums
2014 albums
Russian-language albums